Imagination is the process of producing mental images.

Imagination or Imaginations may also refer to:

Books
Imaginations, William Carlos Williams 1970
Imagination (magazine), a science fiction and fantasy magazine

Film and TV
Imagination (film), a 2007 fantasy film

Companies and leisure
Imagination! (Epcot pavilion), a pavilion at Epcot, a Disney theme park
Imagination Games, an Australian company
Imagination Technologies, a British company
Carnival Imagination, a cruise ship
Mercedes-Benz F200 "Imagination", a concept automobile
ImagiNation Network, a 1990s online gaming network

Organizations
Imagination Foundation, a non-profit organization

Music
Imagination (band), a British soul band
The Imaginations, California band The Charades
The Imaginations, 1974 funk group Tyrone Stewart, Arthur Scales, Jesse Harvey, Nathaniel Pringle
The Imaginations (band), Mari Wilson
The Imaginations Brass, Music of the Virgin Islands

Albums
Imagination (Bethany Dillon album), 2005
Billy Eckstine's Imagination, 1958
Imagination (Brian Wilson album), 1998
Imagination (Curtis Fuller album), 1959
Imagination (Deni Hines album), 1996
Imagination (Dick Haymes album), 1982
Imagination (Gladys Knight & the Pips album), 1973
Imagination (Helen Reddy album), 1983, or the title song
Imagination, a 1958 album by The King Sisters, also a track on the album
Imagination (La Toya Jackson album), 1986, or the title song (see below)
Imagination (Lisette Melendez album), 1998, or the title song
Imagination (The Whispers album), 1980, or the title song
Imagination (Woody Shaw album), 1988
Imaginations (album), 2006, by Fantastic Plastic Machine

Songs
"Imagination" (1940 song), a popular song written by Johnny Burke and Jimmy Van Heusen
"Imagination" (Belouis Some song)
"Imagination" (Cee Farrow song)
"Imagination" (Deni Hines song)
"Imagination" (Gorgon City song)
"Imagination" (JES song)
"Imagination" (La Toya Jackson song)
"Imagination" (Tamia song)
"Imagination", by Erasure from The Innocents
"Imagination", by Jessica Simpson from Irresistible
"Imagination", by Laura Branigan and featured on the soundtrack to Flashdance in 1983
"Imagination", by Milk Inc.
"Imagination", by Pseudo Echo from Race
"Imagination", by Xymox
"Imagination", a 1928 song written by Joseph Meyer and Roger Wolfe Kahn
"Imagination", a song from the television series Small Potatoes

See also
 Imaginary (disambiguation)
 Imagine (disambiguation)